Abracadabra is the sixth studio album by English band ABC. It was originally released in August 1991, on the label EMI. It was the final ABC album to feature founding member Mark White, who departed the band in 1992.

ABC moved to the EMI label, where they recorded the album Abracadabra, a tightly produced fusion of early 1990s techno sounds and 1970s dance grooves which was met with muted critical approval and appreciation from the band's fan base.

The first single, "Love Conquers All", peaked at No. 47 on the UK Singles Chart and remixes of "Say It" (done by Black Box) were well received on the US dance charts.

Background
In a 1997 interview, ABC's lead singer Martin Fry said of the album, "Went round in circles making this. Started in the U.S. in Detroit, Chicago and New York City. Scrapped a lot of music to get to the finished record. Finished it at the Townhouse, Shepherd's Bush. A low."

In a 2004 appearance on VH1's Bands Reunited, Fry said of White's departure: "We signed this big record deal with EMI in Europe and the level of expectation was so high. You felt it every day. And we made a record, and midway through it Mark just says 'I can't do it any more, I've had enough'. And I said to him 'you should persist, you know, let's finish the record'. And at that point he just said 'look I quit, I've had enough, I don't want to do it any more'."

In a 2006 interview, Fry spoke of the album, saying: "We got a massive deal with EMI, but, by then, the group had really burned out .... Some of the record worked. 'Love Conquers All,' and 'Spellbound,' with Phil Manzanera (from Roxy Music), worked. There's some moments on it. What can I say? I'm very critical, very critical."

In a 2009 interview, Fry summed up each ABC album, and said of Abracadabra that it was "A hybrid of different genres, it's idealistic really. You can hear the civil war internally as our lucrative opportunity to make the album of our career slithered through our hands. We perfected the music and atmosphere that became the record, yet the process was indirectly intense."

Critical reception

Upon its release, Betty Page of NME noted the album finds ABC "on the mellow tip, producing the sort of smooth, liquid sound that they'd have killed for in those early, faltering days". She noted that "at times it almost touches on the languidity of late Roxy Music" and there's a "quietly confident maturity about this record that makes it wash over you in warm waves". She concluded, "There's nothing cutting-edge about ABC here, but Abracadabra has a soothing, reflective quality which oozes contentedness." Paul Lester of Melody Maker felt the album "exposes an even deeper love for black American funk and soul" than ABC's previous work, with many of the songs either "borrow[ing] liberally from, or are faithful reconstructions of, essential late Seventies/early Eighties dancehall memories". He felt that ABC "lovingly recreate some of the genre's finest moments" on the album and also noted the "lavish production techniques and exquisite details". He warned that some may find Fry's "occasionally hackneyed lyrical devices hard to take" and added, "Certainly the LP's more drippy moon-June couplets and corny elemental imagery rankle, not least because this was the crooner who once subverted every known cliché in The Lexicon Of Love."

In the US, Billboard described the "lushly produced" album as one which is focused on "state-of-the-charts dance grooves". They praised Fry's "reliably theatrical vocals" and felt that "Club DJs will heartily devour this delicious set". Richard Riccio of the St. Petersburg Times felt that Abracadabra "brings the band full circle, a ride around a six-album arc that has never once been unpleasant and demonstrates why this band is one of the most durable members of the Second British Invasion". Tom Nixon of The Michigan Daily believed most of the album was musically similar to "many of the disco hits of the late 1970s". Although he felt that most of the album's songs had "little individuality", and probably used the "same drum machine" and "keyboard arrangement", he noted the "simple, slightly danceable" rhythms and praised the "crisp" production. He concluded, "ABC fans may be disappointed with the band's latest effort".

Stephen Thomas Erlewine of AllMusic retrospectively considered Abracadabra to be a "disheartening latter-day album from ABC". He felt that they had tried to sound modern by "incorporating both house and smooth Philly soul flourishes to their sound" and, although sometimes the results were "supple and alluring", he felt the album lacked "strong, melodic songs". Peter Buckley, writing in his 2003 book The Rough Guide to Rock, felt that the album was a "half-hearted attempt to reheat the tried and tested formula created and perfected a decade earlier". In the 2003 book The Rough Guide to Cult Pop, author Paul Simpson stated, "Abracadabra probably won't reach out and grab ya".

Track listing

Personnel 
ABC
 Martin Fry – lead vocals
 Mark White – keyboards, synthesizers, programming, guitars 

Additional musicians
 Marius de Vries – keyboards
 Tony Patler – keyboards
 Matt Rowe – keyboards, programming, backing vocals 
 Don Campbell – guitars, drums, backing vocals 
 Phil Manzanera – guitars
 Gota Yashiki – drums, percussion, programming
 Steve Sidelynk – drums, percussion 
 Phil Smith – saxophones
 Derek Green – backing vocals 
 Gina Foster – backing vocals 
 Paul Lee – backing vocals 
 Zeetah Massiah – backing vocals 
 Frankë Pharoah – backing vocals 
 Beverley Skeete – backing vocals 
 Cleveland Watkiss – backing vocals

Production 
 Producers – Martin Fry and Mark White (All tracks); David Bascombe (Tracks 1-9 & 11).
 Engineers – David Bascombe (Tracks 1-9 & 11); Andy Falconer (Track 10).
 Mixing – David Bascombe (Tracks 1-9 & 11); Phil Bodger (Track 10).
 Assistant Engineer and Mixing on Tracks 1-9 & 11 – Richard Arnold 
 Remix on Track 11 – Black Box
 Sleeve Design – Area 
 Photography – Lewis Mulatero
 Management – Bennett Freed

Charts

References

External links

1991 albums
ABC (band) albums
MCA Records albums
EMI Records albums
Parlophone albums